Joseph-Désiré Job (born 1 December 1977) is a former professional footballer who played as a left-winger or attacking midfielder. Born in France, Job represented the Cameroon national team.

After starting his career in France, Job moved to English team Middlesbrough, where he spent six years and is most remembered for scoring one of the two goals in the 2004 League Cup Final, where Middlesbrough won their first ever trophy.

He also played for clubs in Saudi Arabia, Qatar, Turkey and Belgium. Whilst playing for Saudi club Al-Ittihad, he won the 2005 AFC Champions League and scored in the final.

Club career

Lyon
Job was born in the French city of Lyon and began training with the Olympique Lyonnais youth academy at the age of ten. He made his debut for the club in the Intertoto Cup when he was nineteen years old in 1997, scoring a hat-trick as the club beat Polish club Odra Wodzisław 5–2.

Lens
Job joined RC Lens on 1 August 1999.

He scored a number of goals for Lens in the 1999–2000 UEFA Cup as they reached the semi-final stage.

Middlesbrough
Middlesbrough's then manager Bryan Robson signed Job in 2000 for £3 million, where he scored 19 goals in 94 appearances for the club. He also scored 20 minutes into his debut against Coventry City. After struggling to hold down a regular place in the team, he was sent on loan to French Ligue 1 club FC Metz in December 2001, until the end of the season.

On 30 November 2002, Job cracked his skull in a clash of heads with West Bromwich Albion player Darren Moore and was knocked unconscious on the pitch. On 29 September 2003, Job twisted his knee in training and was expected to be out of action for four months, just after scoring the clubs winning goal against Everton with then Middlesbrough manager, Steve McClaren saying, "It's a huge blow for Joseph because he has been playing well lately and he also got our winner against Everton. We'll miss him. The highlight of his career at Middlesbrough came in the 2004 Football League Cup Final on 29 February 2004 when he scored a second minute goal to help the club to win their first ever major trophy, in a 2–1 win over Bolton Wanderers at the Millennium Stadium, Cardiff, a result which also saw the club qualify for the UEFA Cup.

On 15 December 2004, Job scored Middlesbrough's second goal in a 3–0 UEFA Cup Group E win over Serbian club FK Partizan at the Riverside Stadium as they qualified, as winners of the group, for the knockout stages. Middlesbrough went out of the competition in the Round of 32 to Portuguese club, Sporting CP, with Job again scoring in the home leg on 10 March 2005. During his time at Middlesbrough he was the subject of one of the more memorable fan chants, being serenaded by the words "there's only one Job on Teesside!", due to a lot of unemployment in the area at the time.

In the 2005–06 season, he was again sent on loan, this time to Saudi Arabia on 31 August 2005, where he played for Al-Ittihad on a season-long loan. He helped the club win the AFC Champions League in 2005, scoring in the second leg of the final against United Arab Emirates club, Al Ain FC on 5 November 2005 in Jeddah. Job's struggle to win a first-team place became even more difficult, following the signings of established Premiership strikers Mark Viduka, Jimmy Floyd Hasselbaink and Yakubu. His contract with Middlesbrough expired after his loan spell with Al-Ittihad. He spent part of the 2006–07 pre-season training with Watford, but was not offered a contract.

Sedan
Job joined Ligue 1 club CS Sedan on 19 September 2006 on a one-year contract. He capped 28 times and scored 10 goals.

Nice
Job moved to Ligue 1 club OGC Nice in summer 2007, signing a two-year contract.

In summer 2008, he was linked with a move to English Football League Championship club Blackpool.

Lierse
On 15 March 2010, Lierse SK signed the Cameroonian 32-year-old forward as free agent. At the start of the 2009–10 Season, Lierse SK were the major favorites to win the championship in the Belgian second division (EXQI League) but when Job arrived, they were struggling in the deciding moments. Job played his first game against KV Turnhout. He entered the game in the second half, when Lierse was behind 0–1 at home and playing badly. He scored 2 goals and gave 1 assist to help Lierse win the match 3–1 and ultimately helped them win the championship, as he also scored the second goal in the deciding match at home against Red Star Waasland (2–0 win).

Job signed a new contract for Lierse for two seasons on 21 June 2010.

International career
Job was tipped early on to be a future French International player, however he instead accepted a call-up to the Cameroon national team, and made his debut in a 2–0 defeat to England at Wembley Stadium in November 1997.

Job has played at two FIFA World Cup finals, in 1998 and 2002. He also played for Cameroon at the victorious 2000 African Cup of Nations and in the FIFA Confederations Cup in 2001 and 2003. However, his next call up to the Cameroon squad came five years later, in March 2007, when he was called up to the squad for a 2008 Africa Cup of Nations qualifier against Liberia.

In January 2008 he scored three goals in two games, scoring once as Cameroon beat Sudan 2–0 in a friendly match and twice as Cameroon beat Zambia 5–1 in a 2008 African Cup of Nations qualifying match. He was also in the Cameroon squad for the 2008 Africa Cup of Nations.

Personal life
Job is the cousin of FC Ingolstadt 04 midfielder Marvin Matip and Liverpool defender Joël Matip.

Career statistics

International

Honours
Middlesbrough
 Football League Cup: 2004

Al-Ittihad
 AFC Champions League: 2005

Cameroon
 Africa Cup of Nations: 2000

References

External links

1977 births
Living people
French sportspeople of Cameroonian descent
Citizens of Cameroon through descent
People from Vénissieux
Cameroonian Muslims
Cameroonian footballers
French footballers
Association football midfielders
Cameroon international footballers
Ligue 1 players
Premier League players
Süper Lig players
Belgian Pro League players
Challenger Pro League players
Saudi Professional League players
Qatar Stars League players
Olympique Lyonnais players
RC Lens players
Al Kharaitiyat SC players
Middlesbrough F.C. players
FC Metz players
Ittihad FC players
CS Sedan Ardennes players
OGC Nice players
Lierse S.K. players
1998 FIFA World Cup players
2001 FIFA Confederations Cup players
2002 FIFA World Cup players
2003 FIFA Confederations Cup players
1998 African Cup of Nations players
2000 African Cup of Nations players
2002 African Cup of Nations players
2008 Africa Cup of Nations players
Cameroonian expatriate footballers
Cameroonian expatriate sportspeople in France
Expatriate footballers in France
Cameroonian expatriate sportspeople in England
Expatriate footballers in England
Cameroonian expatriate sportspeople in Turkey
Expatriate footballers in Turkey
Cameroonian expatriate sportspeople in Belgium
Expatriate footballers in Belgium
Sportspeople from Lyon Metropolis
Footballers from Auvergne-Rhône-Alpes